Season 2009–10 was the 126th football season in which Dumbarton competed at a Scottish national level, entering the Scottish Football League for the 104th time, the Scottish Cup for the 115th time, the Scottish League Cup for the 63rd time and the Scottish Challenge Cup for the 19th time.

Overview 
Following the success of the previous season, it was manager Jim Chapman's goal to consolidate the club's position in the Second Division. However, Dumbarton were to be devastated before a ball was kicked with the death during the close season of the club captain, Gordon Lennon, from a motoring accident. Nevertheless, despite there being few changes to the playing staff, the league campaign started disappointingly with only two draws to show from the first six starts - resulting in the club propping up the rest of the league. It was, however, to be a temporary blip and although there was no consistency in performances, a mid-table sixth place was achieved in the end.

In the domestic cups, however, it was all bad news - no wins and no goals! In the Scottish Cup, local rivals Morton would be victorious in the third round, after a goalless draw.
 
In the League Cup, Dunfermline Athletic had no difficulty in seeing off Dumbarton in the first round.

Finally, it was no surprise that the League Challenge Cup would witness another first round exit, and it would be Morton again who would do the damage.

Locally, the Stirlingshire Cup was resumed, and after two penalty shoot out wins in the group fixtures, the trophy would return to Dumbarton following a win in the final over Stenhousemuir.

Results & fixtures

Scottish Second Division

Alba Challenge Cup

Co-operative Insurance League Cup

Active Nation Scottish Cup

Stirlingshire Cup

 - won on penalties

Pre-season

League table

Player statistics

Squad 

|}

Transfers

Players in

Players out

See also
 2009–10 in Scottish football

References

External links
Jan Vojacek (Dumbarton Football Club Historical Archive)
Michael White (Dumbarton Football Club Historical Archive)
Ross Harvey (Dumbarton Football Club Historical Archive)
Richie McKillen (Dumbarton Football Club Historical Archive)
Kieran Brannan (Dumbarton Football Club Historical Archive) 
Chris Craig (Dumbarton Football Club Historical Archive)
Scottish Football Historical Archive

Dumbarton F.C. seasons
Scottish football clubs 2009–10 season